William Behan (8 August 1911 – 12 November 1991) was an Irish footballer who played as a goalkeeper for Shelbourne, Shamrock Rovers and Manchester United during the 1930s.

He made his Rovers debut on 8 February 1931 in a 5–1 win over Bray Unknowns at Milltown. In his first season, he won the FAI Cup.

Behan signed for Manchester United in September 1933, along with fellow Irishman David Byrne - they were the first players from the south of Ireland to play for the club in over a decade.

He made his United debut in an English Second Division home game against Bury on 3 March 1934. The following July, he briefly returned to Shelbourne before again returning to Rovers. Over the next two seasons, he won another FAI Cup and a League of Ireland Shield. His last game for the Hoops was on 23 August 1936 in a Shield win over Drumcondra.

After his retirement as a player he became a respected referee and was in charge of the 1943 FAI Cup Final. He then managed Drumcondra in the 1950s where he won the FAI Cup again.

Behan subsequently became United's chief scout in the Republic of Ireland and is credited with discovering, among others, Johnny Carey, Liam Whelan, Tony Dunne, Don Givens, Kevin Moran and Paul McGrath. He also served as vice chairman of the Dalkey-based Leinster Senior League team, Dalkey United and it was through this association that he discovered McGrath.

Behan's father, William Sr., was one of the founder members of Shamrock Rovers. His brothers John and Paddy also played for Rovers. His son William junior kept goal for Rovers side also for a spell. His second cousin was Bob Fullam.

Billy's grandson Philip Behan is the former Head of International Football at the Football Association of Ireland and is now a UEFA and FIFA Agent organising friendly international matches and tournaments around the world.

Billy died in November 1991 at the age of 80.

Honours

As a player
Shamrock Rovers
FAI Cup (2): 1931, 1936
League of Ireland Shield (1): 1934–35

As a manager
Drumcondra
FAI Cup (1): 1954

Sources

The Boys In Green – The FAI International Story (1997): Sean Ryan
The Hoops by Paul Doolan and Robert Goggins

References

External links
 Profile  at MUFCInfo.com
 

1911 births
1991 deaths
People from Dalkey
Sportspeople from Dún Laoghaire–Rathdown
Association footballers from County Dublin
Republic of Ireland association footballers
Association football goalkeepers
League of Ireland players
Shelbourne F.C. players
Shamrock Rovers F.C. players
Manchester United F.C. players
Manchester United F.C. non-playing staff
Republic of Ireland football managers
League of Ireland managers
English Football League players
Republic of Ireland football referees
Drumcondra F.C. managers